Turnianska Nová Ves is a village and municipality in the Greater Košice District in the Košice Region of eastern Slovakia.

History
The village was first mentioned in historical records in 1406.

Geography
The village lies at an elevation of 173 meters and covers an area of 6.42 km².
It has a population of about 360.

External links

Villages and municipalities in Košice-okolie District